Colobostema is a genus of minute black scavenger flies in the family Scatopsidae. There are at least 4 described species in Colobostema.

Species
 Colobostema arizonense Cook, 1956
 Colobostema leechi Cook, 1978
 Colobostema variatum Cook, 1956
 Colobostema varicorne (Coquillett, 1902)

References

Further reading

External links

 

Scatopsidae
Psychodomorpha genera